Laura Elizondo Erhard (born 28 August 1983 in Tampico) is a Mexican beauty pageant titleholder who represented her country at Miss Universe 2005.

Beauty pageants
On 10 September 2004, Elizondo participated in the national beauty pageant Nuestra Belleza México, held in San Luis Potosí. Winning the national crown and becoming the second from the state of Tamaulipas to do so since the pageant first began in 1994, Elizondo obtained the title of Nuestra Belleza México, giving her the right to represent Mexico in the Miss Universe pageant. There she finished as 3rd runner-up to Natalie Glebova of Canada. She also placed 3rd in Best National Costume. Elizondo stated that although she did not win, she was satisfied with the results as well as her accomplishments within the competition. On 2 September 2005, Elizondo was succeeded by Priscila Perales of the state of Nuevo León as the national titleholder. She graduated on 30 May 2008 from Tecnológico de Monterrey with a Bachelor of Business Administration.

See also
 Dafne Molina
 Natalie Glebova

External links

 
 Laura Elizondo at the Nuestra Belleza México Website

1983 births
Living people
Mexican beauty pageant winners
Mexican female models
Mexican people of Basque descent
Mexican people of German descent
Miss Universe 2005 contestants
Nuestra Belleza México winners
People from Tampico, Tamaulipas